Hendijan-e Gharbi Rural District is a rural district (dehestan) in the Central District of Hendijan County, Khuzestan Province, Iran. At the 2006 census, its population was 1,136, in 233 families.  The rural district has 4 villages.

References 

Rural Districts of Khuzestan Province
Hendijan County